Ashton Trevor Calvert,  (9 November 1945 – 16 November 2007) was a senior Australian public servant. He was Secretary of the Department of Foreign Affairs and Trade from April 1998 to January 2005.

Early life
Ashton Calvert was born on 9 November 1945 in Hobart, Tasmania. He was the great-grandchild of William Calvert, a free settler to Tasmania who had arrived on the island in 1832.

Calvert attended Hobart High School and then the University of Tasmania. As a Rhodes Scholar, he went on to attend the University of Oxford, attaining a doctorate in mathematics. During his time at Oxford, Calvert was the president-cox of the Oxford rowing team.

Career
Calvert joined the Australian Public Service in 1970 in the Department of External Affairs (later Department of Foreign Affairs). His first overseas post was to Japan in 1971, where he spent four years.

In October 1993, after nearly two years as a staffer in then Prime Minister Paul Keating's office, Calvert was appointed Australian Ambassador to Japan.

Calvert was appointed Secretary of the Department of Foreign Affairs and Trade in April 1998. During his time as Secretary of the department, Calvert made significant contributions to the Doha Development Round trade negotiations and helped to secure a deal to launch negotiations for a free trade agreement between Australia, New Zealand and the Association of Southeast Asian Nations (since concluded). Calvert retired from his Secretary role in January 2005.

Calvert joined the Rio Tinto Board with effect from 1 February 2005. In August 2005 he was appointed to the Woodside Petroleum Board. He resigned from both boards in November 2007 due to illness, after a medical diagnosis of aggressive cancer.

Awards and honours
Calvert was made a Companion of the Order of Australia in January 2003 for service to the development of Australian foreign policy, including advancement of business relations between Australia and Japan, and for leadership and highly distinguished contributions to Australia's overall economic and security interests at critical times in the international environment.

In 2009, a street in the Canberra suburb of Casey was named Ashton Calvert Street to honour Calvert.

Death
On 16 November 2007, in Canberra, Calvert died from cancer at age 62.

Notes

References and further reading

1945 births
2007 deaths
Ambassadors of Australia to Japan
Australian Rhodes Scholars
Deaths from cancer in the Australian Capital Territory
Companions of the Order of Australia
People from Hobart
Recipients of the Centenary Medal